The Viceroy of Liangjiang or Viceroy of the Two Jiangs, fully referred to in Chinese as the Governor-General of the Two Yangtze Provinces and Surrounding Areas Overseeing Military Affairs, Provisions and Funds, Manager of Waterways, Director of Civil Affairs, was one of eight regional Viceroys in China proper during the Qing dynasty. The Viceroy of Liangjiang had jurisdiction over Jiangsu, Jiangxi and Anhui provinces. Because Jiangsu and Anhui were previously part of a single province, Jiangnan ("south of the Yangtze"), they were thus known, along with Jiangxi ("west of the Yangtze"), as the two jiangs, hence the name "Liangjiang" ("two Jiangs").

History 
The office of Viceroy of Liangjiang originated in 1647 during the reign of the Shunzhi Emperor. It was called "Viceroy of the Three Provinces of Jiangdong, Jiangxi and Henan" (江東江西河南三省總督) and headquartered in Jiangning (江寧; present-day Nanjing, Jiangsu). In 1652, the office was renamed "Viceroy of Jiangxi" (江西總督) and its headquarters shifted to Nanchang for a short while before the old system was restored.

During the reign of the Kangxi Emperor, in 1661 and 1674, two separate Viceroy offices were created for Jiangdong and Jiangxi, but they were merged under the Viceroy of Liangjiang later in 1665 and 1682 respectively. The office's name had remained as "Viceroy of Liangjiang" since then.

In 1723, the Yongzheng Emperor ordered that the Viceroy of Liangjiang would concurrently hold the appointments of Secretary of War (兵部尚書) and Right Censor-in-Chief (右都御史) of the Detection Branch (都察院) in the Censorate.

In 1831, the Daoguang Emperor put the Viceroy of Liangjiang in charge of the salt trade in the Huai River area.

During the reign of the Xianfeng Emperor, the Taiping rebels captured Jiangning (江寧; present-day Nanjing, Jiangsu) and designated it as their capital. The headquarters of the Viceroy of Liangjiang constantly shifted across different locations, including Yangzhou, Changzhou, Shanghai, Suzhou and Anqing.

In 1866, during the reign of the Tongzhi Emperor, the Viceroy of Liangjiang was also put in charge of trade and commerce in the five treaty ports. He also concurrently held the appointment of "Nanyang Trade Minister" (南洋通商大臣); cf. "Beiyang Trade Minister" (北洋通商大臣) held by the Viceroy of Zhili.

After the fall of the Qing dynasty in 1912, the former headquarters of the Viceroy of Liangjiang in Nanjing was converted into a Presidential Palace for the President of the Republic of China until 1949.

List of Viceroys of Liangjiang

References

 

1656 establishments in China